The Australian Masters Games is a biennial sporting event and the largest multi-sport participation sporting event in Australia. Garry Daly as President of the Confederation of Australian Sport proposed the concept of Masters Games to the Northern Territory government.  It went on to establish the Central Australian Masters Games in 1986. The first Australian Masters Games were held in Hobart, Tasmania in 1987. The Australian Masters Games event is owned by the Confederation of Australian Sport and state governments and cities bid to host the Games.
The minimum age for most sports is 30 years of age however some of the sports, like Gymnastics, the minimum age for participation is 20 years of age. 

The estimated number of competitors for future events includes volunteers and social participants. An official breakdown of the three participant categories is provided in an update to the participation report by the organisers following each event.

Sports
These were the sports on offer for the 2021 edition of the games.

 Archery
 Artistic Swimming
 Athletics
 Badminton
 Baseball
 Basketball
 Bocce
 Boxing
 Canoe/Kayak
 Cricket
 Croquet
 Cue Sports
 Cycling
 Dancesport
 Darts
 Dragon Boat
 Fencing
 Figure Skating
 Finswimming
 Football
 Futsal
 Golf
 Gymnastics
 Hockey
 Judo
 Kendo
 Lawn Bowls
 Mountain Bike
 Netball
 Padel
 Petanque
 Powerlifting
 Rowing
 Rowing Indoor
 Rugby Union
 Sailing
 Sailing – Windsurfer LT
 Shooting – clay target, revolver & pistol, smallbore & air rifle
 Softball
 Squash
 Swimming
 Table Tennis
 Taekwondo
 Tennis
 Tenpin Bowling
 Touch Football
 Volleyball - beach and indoor
 Wrestling

External
Australian Masters Games website

References

Masters Games
Recurring sporting events established in 1987
National multi-sport events
Multi-sport events in Australia